This is an ongoing list of current and former monster trucks with their drivers.

List

References

Monster trucks